Kim Hee-Tae (born July 10, 1953) is former South Korean football player and manager. He was served as South Korean national team player for 1974 Asian Games and 1978 Asian Games.

References

External links

1953 births
Living people
Association football defenders
South Korean footballers
South Korea international footballers
Busan IPark players
South Korean football managers
Busan IPark managers
Asian Games medalists in football
Footballers at the 1974 Asian Games
Footballers at the 1978 Asian Games
Asian Games gold medalists for South Korea
Medalists at the 1978 Asian Games